Amanda Davies is a British sports presenter on CNN International.

Amanda Davies may also refer to:

Amanda Davies (actress) 
Amanda Davies (scientist), Australian geographer and lecturer